Ekkamai Road (often popularly referred to as Ekkamai; also spelled: Ekamai), officially named Soi Sukhumvit 63, is a soi in the form of road, and the name of the surrounding its location in Bangkok.

Ekkamai is a road that connects Sukhumvit Road in Khlong Tan Nuea and Phra Khanong Nuea Subdistricts, Watthana District with Phetchaburi Road in Bang Kapi Subdistrict, Huai Khwang District and crosses Khlong Saen Saep canal in the tip phase.

It has a starting point at Ekkamai Tai Junction (แยกเอกมัยใต้), where it intersects Sukhumvit Road opposite Bangkok Eastern Bus Terminal, Science Centre for Education and Bangkok Planetarium, where it is referred to as Soi Sukhumvit 63 and northward up till it ends at Ekkamai Nuea Junction (แยกเอกมัยเหนือ), where it intersects Phetchaburi Road, total length 2,524 m (8,280 ft, 2.5 km), width 18 m (59 ft). The area is served by the Ekkamai Station of the BTS skytrain, whose Sukhumvit Line runs above Sukhumvit Road.  

Ekkamai is regarded as part of Sukhumvit Road, just like the nearby Thong Lo, and have two connected alleys. Because it is filled with the location of offices, restaurants and cafés, pubs and bars, embassies, banks, condominiums and foreign residents. Once it was the location of the residence of MR Seni Pramoj, the sixth Prime Minister of Thailand.

References

Streets in Bangkok
Neighbourhoods of Bangkok